Go Europe! is the fourth album of Japanese band Electric Eel Shock and was released in 2004 in Europe. This album was renamed and released also as Go USA!.

Track numbers in the following production information refers to the Bitzcore release of Go Europe!. Tracks 1, 8, 9, 11, 12, 13, 14, 15, and 16 were recorded at Sound Studio Face, Tokyo, Japan by Electric Eel Shock. Tracks 2, 3, 4, 5, 6, 7, and 10 were recorded at 2 kHz, London, England by Sean Doherty. All tracks except 11, 14, and 15 were mixed and co-produced by Sean Doherty. Tracks 11, 14, and 15 were mixed and co-produced by Richard Narco. The album was mastered by Doug Shearer at Townhouse Studios, London, England.

Track listing

This track listing corresponds to the Bitzcore release of Go Europe!.

Tracks 15 and 16 are Enhanced CD content (video clips).

The Demolition release of Go Europe! in the UK has a different track order with two additional songs ("Mathesar" and "Joyride Rock'N'Roll") and is not an Enhanced CD:

Release history

References

Personnel
 Akihito Morimoto - Guitar/Vocals
 Kazuto Maekawa - Bass
 Tomoharu "Gian" Ito - Drums
 Bob Slayer - Manager

External links
The band's official homepage
Bob Slayer's website (EES Manager, Video Director, Producer and now successful Stand Up comic)

Electric Eel Shock albums
2004 albums